Team Alpha Male is a martial arts gym based in Sacramento, California, United States. It is one of the pioneering schools of mixed martial arts (MMA) among the lower weight classes. It has produced three UFC Champions,  T.J. Dillashaw, Cody Garbrandt and Deiveson Figueiredo.

Overview 
Urijah Faber founded Team Alpha Male in 2004. The team trains primarily out of Ultimate Fitness located in Sacramento, California. 
Members of the team played an integral part of Team Faber during Season 15, Season 22 and Season 25 of The Ultimate Fighter.
From December 2012 to May 2014 the head coach of Team Alpha Male was the 2013 MMA Coach of the Year UFC veteran Duane Ludwig. 
Longtime UFC contender Martin Kampmann began serving as coach for the team in September 2014.

In 2018, Team Alpha Male won a team grappling tournament at Quintet where they defeated Team Polaris in the finals.

Notable people

Mixed martial artists 

Urijah Faber-Former WEC Featherweight Champion
T.J. Dillashaw-Former UFC Bantamweight Champion
Cody Garbrandt-Former UFC Bantamweight Champion
Deiveson Figueiredo-Former UFC Flyweight Champion 
Clay Guida-Former Strikeforce Lightweight  Champion
Lance Palmer - Winner of the PFL 2018 and 2019 featherweight tournaments, Former WSOF Featherweight Champion
Chad Mendes
Joseph Benavidez
Sage Northcutt
Darren Elkins
Josh Emmett
Li Jingliang
Song Yadong
Su Mudaerji
Paige VanZant
Yan Xiaonan

Grapplers 
Gordon Ryan
Antoine Jaoude

Trainers 
Urijah Faber
Justin Buchholz
Danny Castillo
Chris Holdsworth

Awards 
World MMA Awards
 2014 Gym of the Year
 2014 Coach of the Year: Duane Ludwig
 2013 Gym of the Year
 2013 Coach of the Year: Duane Ludwig

See also
List of Top Professional MMA Training Camps

References

External links 
 Official Website

Mixed martial arts training facilities
Sports in Sacramento, California